New York State Route 412 (NY 412) is a state highway in Oneida County, New York, in the United States. It serves as a connector between NY 233, which bypasses the village of Clinton to the west, and NY 12B, which passes through the village. NY 412 is a two-lane highway its entire length. It was assigned in the mid-1930s, originally extending from the Hamilton College campus west of NY 233 to Clinton. It was cut back to its present length in the early 1950s.

Route description

NY 412 begins at an intersection with NY 233 and College Hill Road (unsigned NY 922C) in the town of Kirkland just east of the Hamilton College campus. The route progresses eastward past a short strip of a residences as College Street before crossing over a creek and entering the village of Clinton. It continues to serve residential neighborhoods until it meets Chenango Avenue near the center of the village, at which the surroundings transition from residential to commercial. NY 412 ends one block later at a junction with NY 12B (Franklin Avenue). College Street continues east from this point as part of NY 12B.

History
The state of New York assumed maintenance of the east–west roadway linking Hamilton College to the village of Clinton by 1926. It was designated NY 412 in the mid-1930s, serving as a posted connector between the college and NY 12B, the primary north–south road through the village. In the early 1950s, the route was truncated on its western end to its junction with NY 233 east of the campus. Most of NY 412's former routing to Hamilton College became part of County Route 13 by 1978; however, the easternmost  is still state-maintained as NY 922C, an unsigned reference route.

Major intersections

See also

References

External links

412
Transportation in Oneida County, New York